Bloomsbury is a historic home located near Orange, Orange County, Virginia. The original section dates to the early- to mid-18th century, and is a -story, frame Colonial dwelling with a steep gable roof and "U"-plan stairway of a form unknown elsewhere in Virginia. It retains nearly all its original late-Georgian interior detailing. It was doubled in size about 1797, with a two-story Federal-period addition that stands at right angles to the original block and is flanked by early shed-roofed end wings. The house was restored in the 1960s.  Also on the property are a contributing 19th-century smokehouse, a contributing 18th-century cemetery, and a contributing garden site.

It was listed on the National Register of Historic Places in 1992.

References

Houses on the National Register of Historic Places in Virginia
Houses completed in 1797
Colonial architecture in Virginia
Georgian architecture in Virginia
Houses in Orange County, Virginia
National Register of Historic Places in Orange County, Virginia